Dōjunkai (shinjitai: ,) was a corporation set up a year after the 1923 Kantō earthquake to provide reinforced concrete (and thus earthquake- and fire-resistant) collective housing in the Tokyo area. Its formal name was Zaidan-hōjin Dōjunkai, i.e. the Dōjunkai corporation. The suffix kai means organization, and dōjun was a term coined to suggest the spread of the nutritious benefit of the water of river and sea. It was overseen by the Home Ministry.

The corporation was in existence from 1924 through 1941; it was involved in construction between 1926 and 1934, primarily 1926–30, building 16 complexes. The last complex, Uenoshita apartment, was finally demolished in 2013.

History 
From 1926 to 1930, Dōjunkai created fifteen apartment complexes (apāto or apātomento), two in Yokohama and the rest in Tokyo. Among the latter, the best known is Dōjunkai Aoyama Apartments (built 1926–7), which stood on the avenue of Omotesandō toward its Harajuku Station end. Toward the end of what was by Tokyo standards a long life, the ivy-covered building was increasingly used for ateliers and small independent shops. It was destroyed for the 2005 construction by Mori Building of "Omotesando Hills", a conventional shopping mall. Dōjunkai built one last complex in Tokyo, Dōjunkai Edogawa apāto, between 1932 and 1934.

Dōjunkai was wound up in 1941.

Remarkably, all the apartment complexes survived wartime bombing. 

After the war, the government sold the land of most of the complexes to real estate companies, notably Mori Building. Thereafter, the combination of desire for greater profits, lack of advance publicity, and lack of government interest in this genre of architecture, in addition to inadequate maintenance and the lack of amenities (notably individual bathing facilities) now taken for granted, have led to the destruction of most of the complexes in the name of "site development".

Currently the only original building can be seen at a conversion project at Dojunkan building, Omotesando Hills. Some shops and galleries are in the building with its facade of a genuine three-stories apartment.

List of Dōjunkai Apartments

Further reading
Design of Doujunkai. (Japanese title ). Tokyo: Kenchiku Shiryō Kenkyūsha, 2000.  A book of new photographs of the buildings, with (minimal) text in both Japanese and English.
 "Dōjunkai apāto" in Japanese-language Wikipedia
 Hashimoto Fumitaka, et al. Kieyuku Dōjunkai apātomento (The disappearing Dōjunkai apartments). Tokyo: Kawade Shobō Shinsha, 2003. . Informative book about all the buildings but concentrating on Edogawa Apartments (where Hashimoto lived), with plenty of plans, historic photographs, and new photographs taken by Youki Kanehira.
Kanehira Youki. Photographs of Dōjunkai Aoyama apāto.
Pompili, M. Dojunkai Apartments: Tokyo 1924-1934. Rome: Editrice Librerie Dedalo, 2001. . The Dōjunkai Apartments in the context of the development of housing in Japan during the early 20th century. 
 Dōjunkai Aoyama apāto chronology.
 Miscellany about Dōjunkai Aoyama apāto.
 Ueda Makoto. Shūgō jūtaku monogatari (The story of collective housing). Tokyo: Misuzu, 2004. . This historical survey of collective housing in Japan (whose content was previously published within Tokyojin) has sections devoted to the Aoyama, Kiyosumidōri, Uguisudani and Ōtsuka Joshi Apartments, with new photographs by Hiroh Kikai and some archival photographs.
Wijers-Hasegawa, Yumi. "Dwellers bought off; ball to fall on Aoyama flats". Japan Times, 19 April 2002.

Notes

References

Construction and civil engineering companies established in 1924
Companies disestablished in 1941
Buildings and structures in Tokyo
Defunct organizations based in Japan
Former buildings and structures in Japan
Construction and civil engineering companies of Japan
Public housing
1941 disestablishments in Japan
Japanese companies established in 1924